Kaj Linna (born 24 January 1971) is a Finnish former professional ice hockey defenseman who was a two-time All-American for Boston University and won a Liiga championship in 1998.

Career
Linna was a member of Finland's under-18 team at the 1989 European championships and continued to make a name for himself in his home country. He received a scholarship to Boston University in 1991 and was part of the increased influx of European players into college hockey following the collapse of the Soviet Union. Linna was a top defenseman for the Terriers almost from the start, being named an All-American as a sophomore and helping BU reach the first of five consecutive Frozen Fours. While his offensive production dipped as a junior, he picked up the pace in the postseason and got the Terriers to make an appearance in the championship game. For his final season with BU, Linna's offense returned to normal and he was named to the All-American squad for a second time. He pushed the Terriers to a second consecutive Hockey East championship and then helped the team win the 1995 NCAA Championship, assisting on the game-winning goal in the final match.

Due to a new CBA for the NHL in 1995, Linna was eligible to be drafted despite being 24 at the time. With a very successful college career on his resume, he was taken by the Ottawa Senators in the 8th round. He then began his professional career in Ottawa's farm system leading the defense in scoring. After the season he decided to return home and played for HIFK for two years. In 1998 he helped HIFK win the league championship without losing a single game in the postseason. He capped off the year by winning a silver medal with the Finnish National Team at the World Championships.

Linna returned to North America the following year for a second attempt at reaching the NHL. He played 11 games for the Milwaukee Admirals before suffering a neck injury that ended his career.

Career statistics

Regular season and playoffs

International

Awards and honors

References

External links

1971 births
Living people
Finnish expatriate ice hockey players in the United States
Ice hockey people from Helsinki
Finnish ice hockey defencemen
Boston University Terriers men's ice hockey players
AHCA Division I men's ice hockey All-Americans
NCAA men's ice hockey national champions
HIFK (ice hockey) players
Prince Edward Island Senators players
Milwaukee Admirals players
Ottawa Senators draft picks